Joseph Charles Fields Jr. (born November 14, 1953) is a former professional American football center  and guard in the National Football League (NFL) for the New York Jets and the New York Giants.

Early life and education
Fields was raised in Deptford Township, New Jersey and graduated from Gloucester Catholic High School in Gloucester City, New Jersey in 1971.

NFL career
Fields played college football at Widener University in Chester, Pennsylvania and was drafted in the 14th round of the 1975 NFL Draft by the New York Jets. Fields was a two-time Pro Bowl selection during the 1981 and 1982 seasons. He played for the Jets for 12 years before spending his final year in the National Football League with the New York Giants in 1988. Following the 1988 season, he was not offered a contract by the Giants and retired.

Post-retirement
In 1989, he released a book, Nose to Nose: Survival in the Trenches of the NFL, co-authored with his friend and former roommate Joe Klecko. Klecko and Fields had lined up across from each other in Jets' practices for eleven years.

He became director of contractor services for a New Jersey patio and stonework company. and resides in Woodstown, New Jersey. 

In 2016, Fields was inducted into the Widener University Athletic Hall of Fame.

References

External links
Complete stats at Pro Football Reference

1953 births
Living people
American football centers
American Conference Pro Bowl players
American football offensive guards
Ed Block Courage Award recipients
Gloucester Catholic High School alumni
New York Giants players
New York Jets players
People from Deptford Township, New Jersey
Sportspeople from Woodbury, New Jersey
Widener Pride football players